SAS Isaac Dyobha was a  of the South African Navy.

She was commissioned in 1979 and originally named SAS Frans Erasmus for former National Party cabinet minister Frans Erasmus and launched by his widow. She was renamed on 1 April 1997. She was upgraded in 2012/2013 to an Offshore Patrol Vessel role by removing one of her OTO Melara 76 mm guns and her scorpion missile launchers.

From 2013 the SAS Isaac Dyobha was employed on anti piracy patrols. She was decommissioned in 2022.

References

1979 ships
Missile boats of the South African Navy
Ships built in South Africa
Military units and formations in Durban